Liu Ou (born 13 November 1986) is a Chinese synchronized swimmer.

Liu competed in the women's team event at the 2008 Summer Olympics where she won a bronze medal. She followed up this success in the women's duet and women's team events at the 2012 Summer Olympics where she won a bronze (with Huang Xuechen) and silver medal respectively.

After her retirement in 2013, Liu Ou went to the United States to coach the Santa Clara Aquamaids.

References 

1986 births
Living people
Chinese synchronized swimmers
Olympic bronze medalists for China
Olympic synchronized swimmers of China
Synchronized swimmers at the 2008 Summer Olympics
Synchronized swimmers at the 2012 Summer Olympics
Olympic medalists in synchronized swimming
Asian Games medalists in artistic swimming
Olympic silver medalists for China
Synchronized swimmers from Guangdong
People from Zhanjiang
Artistic swimmers at the 2006 Asian Games
Artistic swimmers at the 2010 Asian Games
Medalists at the 2012 Summer Olympics
Medalists at the 2008 Summer Olympics
World Aquatics Championships medalists in synchronised swimming
Synchronized swimmers at the 2011 World Aquatics Championships
Synchronized swimmers at the 2009 World Aquatics Championships
Synchronized swimmers at the 2007 World Aquatics Championships
Asian Games gold medalists for China
Medalists at the 2006 Asian Games
Medalists at the 2010 Asian Games
Chinese expatriate sportspeople in the United States
Synchronized swimming coaches